The Sound of Islay is a narrow strait between the islands of Islay and Jura off the west coast of Scotland. The islands in the Sound are Am Fraoch Eilean, Brosdale Island and Glas Eilean, all of which are off the south east coast of Jura. These islands, Jura south of Loch Tarbert and the eastern part of the Sound are one of 40 National Scenic Areas in Scotland.

History
Am Fraoch Eilean (meaning "heather isle") contains the ruins of the medieval stronghold Claig Castle. It was built by Somerled  in 1154 to defend the Sound and later used as a prison. Unusually for the Argyll islands the design, which is a Norman square tower with  walls, is similar in style to mainland castles of the period. The Sound has been suggested as the location of the 1156 Battle of Epiphany.

In 1549 Dean Monro wrote: "At the mouth of Kyle Ila, betwixt it and Duray, lyes ane ile, callit in Erische Leid Ellan Charne, in English the iyle of Earne".

Ferry
Argyll and Bute Council operate a vehicle and passenger ferry service across the Sound from Feolin slipway on the west coast of Jura to Port Askaig on Islay, and Caledonian MacBrayne operate a vehicle and passenger ferry between Port Askaig and Kennacraig, on the mainland in West Loch Tarbert.

Renewable energy

In March 2011, the Scottish Government approved the largest tidal array in the world for the Sound of Islay, with 10 planned tidal turbines predicted to generate enough power for over 5,000 homes. The site offers both high currents and shelter from storms.

Notes

References
 
 Marsden, John (2008) Somerled and the Emergence of Gaelic Scotland. Birlinn. East Linton. First published, 2000.
 
 RCAHMS (1984) Argyll: Islay, Jura, Colonsay & Oronsay.

External links

Islay
Landforms of Islay
Jura, Scotland
Landforms of Argyll and Bute